The 1900 Newfoundland general election was held on 8 November 1900 to elect members of the 19th General Assembly of Newfoundland in the self-governing British colony. The Liberal Party led by Robert Bond formed the government. The unpopular railway policy of the Conservatives contributed to their defeat at the polls. The Tory government of James Spearman Winter was defeated largely due to its railway policy and his conservative party fell into disarray.

Results by party

Elected members
 Bay de Verde
 Henry J. B. Woods Liberal
 Isaac Mercer Liberal, elected in 1902
 Michael T. Knight Liberal
 Bonavista Bay
 Alfred B. Morine Tory
 Darius Blandford Tory
 Mark Chaplin Tory
 Burgeo-LaPoile
 Charles Emerson Liberal
 Burin
 Henry Gear, Liberal
 Edward H. Davey Liberal
 Carbonear
 Joseph Maddick Liberal
 Ferryland
 Michael P. Cashin Liberal
 J. D. Ryan Liberal
 Fogo
 Henry Earle Liberal
 Fortune Bay
 Charles Way Liberal
 Harbour Grace
 Eli Dawe Liberal
 A. W. Harvey Liberal
 William Austin Oke Liberal
 Harbour Main
 Frank J. Morris Liberal
 J. J. St. John Liberal
 Placentia and St. Mary's
 E. M. Jackman Liberal
 Thomas Bonia Liberal
 Richard T. McGrath Liberal
 Port de Grave
 A. M. McKay Tory
 St. Barbe
 Alexander Parsons Liberal
 St. George's
 William R. Howley Liberal
 St. John's East
 William Dwyer Liberal
 Lawrence Furlong Liberal (speaker)
 Thomas J. Murphy Liberal
 St. John's West
 Edward P. Morris Liberal
 John Anderson Liberal
 John Scott Liberal
 Trinity Bay
 George W. Gushue Liberal
 George M. Johnson Liberal
 Robert Watson Tory, elected 1902
 William H. Horwood Liberal
 William Warren Tory, elected 1902
 Twillingate
 Robert Bond Liberal
 James A. Clift Liberal
 George Roberts Liberal

References
 

1900
1900 elections in Canada
1900 elections in North America
Pre-Confederation Newfoundland
1900 in Newfoundland
November 1900 events